Nikolay Yaroshenko (born 22 April 1986)  is a Russian triathlete.

Career
Yaroshenko was born and grew up in Ukraine in the Makeyevka town of Donetsk region. He played football In the childhood, but later gave preference to swimming. In 1999 he became the prize-winner of the Junior championship of Ukraine. In 2001 he moved to Donetsk and studied Physical culture and sports High school of S. Bubka. In 2003 Nikolay won the Junior Championship of Ukraine and took part in the European championship team race where they took 7th place. In 2004 Yaroshenko became a member of the Ukraine national triathlon team. That same year his team took the 2nd place at the European championship. In 2006 he was selected to represent Ukraine at the European and World championship where he took the 3rd place in the relay race.

In 2007 he was the overall winner of the Russian Cup. In 2009 Nikolay took the 6th place at the Russian championship and 2nd place in the relay championship. In 2010, racing in France, he had his first experience racing in long distance triathlon. In 2012, he took 7th place at the ITU Long Distance Triathlon World Championships. At next year's following long distance championship he would place 9th.

Results
 Ukraine National Champion (2005-2006)
 Multiple Russian National Championships podiums (2007-2012) team-relay
 Continental Cups podiums (2009-2012)

Gallery

References

Russian male triathletes
1986 births
Living people